Allen Howard "Red" Conkwright (December 4, 1896 – July 30, 1991) was a Major League Baseball pitcher who played for the Detroit Tigers in .

External links

1896 births
1991 deaths
Detroit Tigers players
Major League Baseball pitchers
Baseball players from Missouri
Utah State Aggies baseball players